Ludovico Lana (c. 1597–1646) was an Italian painter of the Baroque period, mainly active in Modena, where he died in 1646. He is also known as Lodovico Lana. He was the director of the Accademia Ducale of Modena. He is said to have been born in Codigoro to a Ferrarese merchant, whose family was originally from Brescia. He appears to have trained with Scarsellino in Ferrara. He then spent some time in Bologna, where he may have worked under or learned the style of either Reni or Guercino.

He helped decorate the Ducal Palace of Sassuolo. He painted an altarpiece for the Chiesa del Voto in Modena, depicting the Virgin Mary stopping the plague of 1630, which shows the town of Modena in low aerial view below the image of the Basilica of the Madonna della Ghiara. Below the virgin are pleading and dying citizens.

One of his pupils was Giovanni Vernulli.

Sources

References

1590s births
1646 deaths
16th-century Italian painters
Italian male painters
17th-century Italian painters
Painters from Modena
Italian Baroque painters